The Croatian Air Force ( or HRZ) is a branch of the Croatian Armed Forces whose primary task is to ensure the sovereignty of the airspace of the Republic of Croatia and to provide aviation support to other branches in the implementation of their tasks in joint operations. It is also the carrier and the organiser of the integrated anti-aircraft defence system of the Republic of Croatia.

Aviation history

The Croatian Air Force as it is known today was established on 12 December 1991, during the Croatian War of Independence. After 2003, a large portion of the fleet was modernised or completely overhauled and the rest of the outdated fleet was retired. Croatia also acquired new-build transport helicopters, fire-fighting aircraft and basic training aircraft during this time. The planned acquisitions for additional fixed and rotary-wing transports and fighter aircraft were repeatedly postponed due to a difficult economic situation.

Duties
The primary role of the Croatian Air Force is securing the sovereignty of Croatian air space and providing air support to other services during joint operations. It operates the integrated Croatian Air Defence system. Other tasks include providing help in natural, humanitarian and technological disasters, search and rescue operations, and support to other government agencies.

Status 

The core of the air force is a squadron of 12 modernised MiG-21 fighters. In 2003, a minor upgrade and an extensive overhaul were performed in Romania, incorporating navigation and communication elements of the Lancer standard to make them interoperable with NATO air forces. The aircraft received no upgrade to their weapons systems. Despite initial plans to replace the MiG-21 fleet with a multirole aircraft in 2013 (delayed from 2011 due to the financial crisis) and an official tender having been issued in 2008, ongoing budgetary constraints have resulted in an abandonment of these plans. As a cost-saving measure, a decision was made to again overhaul seven serviceable airframes already in service and supplement them with five additional airframes from Ukrspetsexport. This temporary measure will see the fleet remain in service only until 2019–2020.

Pilot training is conducted on two types of aircraft. During late 2007, five new Zlin 242L Aerobatic basic trainers were acquired in order to replace a fleet of seven old Utva 75s (four had already been retired previously). The deal was worth just under $2 million. An option for three additional basic trainers was considered but has not been exercised. The backbone of the training fleet, however, is built around 20 Pilatus PC-9M advanced trainers which also constitute the most numerous type of aircraft in Croatian service. These were ordered in 1997 (3 were former RAAF PC-9A examples converted to PC-9M standard immediately upon delivery) and entered full service a year later. The deal was worth around $100 million. They are also operated by the national aerobatic team called Krila Oluje / Wings of Storm. The fleet size and facilities at Zemunik airbase allow the Croatian Air Force to offer advanced pilot training to other countries but the lack of HUDs, HOTAS and weapon stations on Croatia's PC-9Ms, however, limits the usefulness of Croatia's advanced training programme. Such upgrades might be financially plausible once surplus PC-9Ms get sold. Nonetheless, on March 5, 2014, representatives of the Croatian Air Force signed an agreement with their partners from the Royal Air Force of Oman for the future training and education of 16 Omani pilots on the Croatian fleet of Pilatus PC-9Ms. The training itself started on March 10, is planned to be concluded by December 26, 2014 and will see each pilot log 150 flight hours during the ten-month period. As a cost-saving measure, the Croatian government has announced in its long-term defence plan that it plans to downsize the PC-9M fleet to a "suitable level" for the current air force fleet, substantially reduced since the mid-1990s. Consequently, six oldest units are offered for sale while the 14 remaining aircraft are due to remain active and possibly undergo an upgrade.

The Croatian Air Force operated two Antonov An-32B tactical transports (built in 1991 and 1993) until 2013. Both aircraft underwent a two-stage modernisation in 2004 and 2007. They were fitted with NATO-standard navigational and communication equipment, additional systems for loading/unloading and flare dispensers. They had performed humanitarian and paratrooper missions as well as supporting Croatia's international military commitments such as for ISAF and KFOR. Due to budget limitations both aircraft have been offered for sale. In the draft of the strategic defence review, the Croatian government announced that no new tactical transport aircraft would be purchased before 2020 leaving Croatia reliant on its NATO partners for fixed-wing transport.

The helicopter fleet is equipped mainly with Russian-built Mi-17s and its derivates. The fleet includes three Mi-8 and 11 Mi-8MTV-1 (also known as Mi-17-1V) cargo helicopters, which underwent overhauls between 2003 and 2005. A batch of 6 Mi-8MTV-1 underwent an overhaul again in 2013 and 2014, while the remaining 8 units are to follow in 2014 and 2015. The Croatian Ministry of Defence is considering the option of selling all Mi-8 helicopters upon overhaul and replacing them with up to 15 UH-60L after 2017.

In 2006, a deal to deliver 10 new Mi-171Sh transport-attack helicopters was signed with Russia, itself a partial payment for an old Russian debt. The order itself was worth $66 million. The new type differs from the ones already in service in having a cargo ramp instead of clamshell doors, larger side doors, flare dispensers, additional armour around the cockpit and cargo compartment, night vision device equipment, door gunner posts, rocket launchers etc. The entire squadron of 10 helicopters entered service by July 2008. Two additional VIP helicopters were planned for 2009 but their acquisition was cancelled.

After more than 10 years in the Croatian service and great success in Operation Storm, the government finally decided to retire a squadron of seven Mi-24V helicopters in 2005 due to a costly modernisation. Six are offered for sale at a price of $83,000 per aircraft, while one was sent to a museum. The role of an armed support helicopter was taken over by new Mi-171s but the entire attack helicopter squadron is to be revived in 2015 with the acquisition of up to 16 OH-58D.

While visiting Israel in November 2006, Croatian delegation agreed to buy two mid-size, state-of-the-art Hermes 450 and four small Skylark UAVs. Additional cameras, computer systems, spare parts and a ground station were also obtained. Two additional Skylark UAVs entered service in 2009. As of December 2012, additional Skylarks has been reported in service though no public records or images of Croatian Hermes 450 are available. This suggests that the order was cancelled due to funding issues.

After a horrible fire season during the summer of 2007 (12 firefighters lost their lives on a small island of Kornati), Croatia agreed to buy two new Canadair CL-415 and five Air Tractor AT-802 water bombers. These joined a fleet of four relatively new amphibians already in service. The entire deal was projected at $70 million. By making such an acquisition, Croatia became the leading power in aerial firefighting on the Mediterranean in respect to its population and surface. The Croatian Air Force holds a world record of 160 water drops by a single crew on a single day, representing an average of one drop every three minutes for the duration of eight hours.

Commanders

Commanders of the Croatian Air Force since its establishment in 1991:
Imra Agotić (1991–1996)
Josip Čuletić (1996–2001)
Josip Štimac (2001–2002)
Viktor Koprivnjak (2002–2007)
Vlado Bagarić (2007–2011)
Dražen Šćuri (2011–2016)
Miroslav Kovač (2016–2017)
Mato Mikić (2017–2019)
Michael Križanec (2019–present)

Structure

 Air Force and Air Defence Command, in Zagreb
 Command Company, in Pleso (Zagreb Airport)
 91st Air Force Base, in Pleso
 Command Company
Fighter Aircraft Squadron, flying MiG-21bisD/UMD
Multirole Helicopter Squadron, flying Mi-171Sh (at 94th Air Force Base, in Lučko)
 Aeronautical Technical Battalion
 93rd Air Force Base, in Zadar 
 Command Company
Transport Helicopter Squadron, flying Mi-8 MTV-1 (at 95th Air Force Base in Divulje)
Aircraft Training Squadron, flying PC-9M, Zlin 242L
Firefighting Squadron, flying CL-415, AT-802A/F FireBoss
Combat Helicopter Squadron, flying OH-58D, Bell 206B-3
 Aeronautical Technical Battalion
 Airspace Surveillance and Control Battalion, at 91st Air Force Base
 Airspace Surveillance Center, in Podvornica, reports to NATO's Integrated Air Defence System CAOC Torrejón in Spain
 Sector Operation Center, in Split to coordinate with the Croatian Coast Guard
 Mount Sljeme, Borinci, Papuk, Učka and Mount Rota radar posts with AN/FPS-117 radars
 Radio-technical Maintenance and Support Company, at 91st Air Force Base
 Air Force Training Center  "Rudolf Perešin", at 93rd Air Force Base

MiG-21 replacement acquisition

Although the MiG-21 was perceived as an outdated fighter by the Croatian Air Force even in the late 1990s, budget constraints have been continuously deferring any final decision on the acquisition of a new fighter type. As Croatia was no longer facing any military threat, serious talks were started with Israeli firms to extensively upgrade the fleet of 24 MiG-21bis/UM fighters to a "Lancer 3" standard instead of buying a completely new combat aircraft.

Although the initial information suggested that such a decision was practically final, no agreement was reached. By late 2002 all 24 MiG-21's were reaching the end of their service lives and it was decided that the fleet be overhauled and lightly upgraded in Romania. A first squadron of 12 aircraft was therefore sent for 10-year life prolongation repair to Aerostar after which the second squadron was to follow. But after the first squadron arrived to Croatia, no further moves were made in order to revamp the second squadron.

As the fleet of 12 overhauled MiG-21s was originally planned to remain active only until late 2011, Croatia was eyeing a replacement aircraft already by late 2008. It was projected that a new type be selected by late 2009 and that the first aircraft start entering service by 2011. Such plans were put into question by the global economic crisis which severely affected the Croatian economy and in late 2010 it was officially unveiled that no new aircraft were envisaged to enter service.

The Defence Ministry finally announced in June 2013 that the Ukrainian firm Ukrspetsexport will provide Croatia with 8 single-seat and 4 twin-seat upgraded MiG-21 aircraft. Due to their condition only 7 of these will be refurbished Croatian air frames and the remaining 5 will be used aircraft which are owned by Ukrspetsexport. These are to remain in service until the end of 2022 and the decision on the replacement fighter type is to be made by the end of 2019.

2017 program restart

In July 2017, the Croatian Ministry of Defence announced it had restarted the MiG-21 replacement procurement program, and issued a request for proposals for up to 12 aircraft to five countries: Greece, Israel and the United States for the General Dynamics F-16 Fighting Falcon, Sweden for the Saab JAS 39 Gripen, and South Korea for the KAI T-50 Golden Eagle.

In October 2017, the Ministry announced it had received four letters of intent for up to 18 aircraft from the United States, Israel and Greece offering various F-16 variants, as well as Sweden offering an unknown Saab JAS 39 Gripen variant. South Korea did not place a bid in the tender.

In November 2017, Croatian media announced the offers from Sweden for the Saab JAS 39 Gripen and Israel for a mixed-fleet of A/B and C/D General Dynamics F-16 Fighting Falcon variants had been downselect from the four received letters of intent. According to reports, the US bid was dismissed for being too expensive, and the F-16 Block 30 offered by Greece was dismissed for being too outdated. Further reports insinuate the Israeli offer is leading for being most price-competitive, as well as opening up additional opportunities for defence cooperation.

On 29 March 2018, the Croatian Government unanimously adopted a decision on the procurement of 12 F-16 C/D Barak Block 30 aircraft from Israel for 2.9 billion kunas (around 420 million euros). Besides 12 jets, Croatia will get two flight simulators, training for its pilots and maintenance staff in Israel, aircraft weapons, a package of spare parts and equipment for ground support, infrastructure construction and adaptation, and three years of support, including the presence of Israeli instructors in Croatia. The first two jets are expected to be delivered in 2020, and the rest by 2022.

On 6 December 2018, Israeli media reported that the Trump administration halted the arms deal citing Israel's refusal to comply with the U.S. arms transfer guidelines. According to the guidelines, all modifications done to the planes need to be removed before the transfer of ownership is completed (i.e., return the jets to factory conditions). Croatian government officials stated that Croatia will only accept planes that were agreed upon in the tender.

On 27 December 2018, the United States Congress gave the go ahead to complete the arms deal under the condition that the planes are returned to factory conditions.

On 29 December 2018, Večernji list reported that the Croatian government unofficially bailed out of the tender leaving Israel and the United States to work out their dispute.

On 10 January 2019, it was officially confirmed that the procurement had fallen through. The Croatian government announced that it will officially abolish the tender of 14 January 2019.

On 2 April 2020, the revised program to replace MiG-21s was delayed indefinitely due to COVID pandemic.

2020 program continuation 
In the aftermath of Croatian parliamentary election of 2020 new-old Plenković led government continued the program. In September of same year the commission dealing with the acquisition had announced that they have received four official offers of acquisition; used Israeli F-16, used French Dassault Rafale, new F-16V and new Swedish JAS Gripen C/D. Croatian Defence Minister Mario Banožić announced that the final decision will be made by the end of 2020. In late May 2021 Prime Minister Andrej Plenković announced the purchase of 12 used French Dassault Rafale aircraft to replace its Mig-21 fighters.

Modernisation and procurement programs 
Croatia is to receive two UH-60M helicopters as a donation from the United States. These are expected to be delivered by 2022. Another two helicopters have also been cleared for purchase by the US State Department. The expected deal, worth an estimated 115 million USD, would need to be approved by the US Congress to move forward.
The Croatian interdepartmental commission for the procurement of multi-purpose combat aircraft said that it had received five letters of expression of interest to provide the country with new fighter jets and eight letters of expression of interest for second-hand jets. Requests for proposals (RFP) are sent for seven offers, including two new fighter types (F-16 Block 70/72 and JAS-39C/D) and five second hand fighters types (F-16AM/BM, F-16C/D, F-16 Barak, Eurofighter Typhoon and Dassault Rafale). Croatia’s government said it expects to receive the new offers by May and make the decision by August 2020. In April 2020 it was announced that the procurement of fighter jets is being delayed due to Coronavirus epidemic and earthquake in Zagreb.
Procurement of 32 AGM-114 missiles for recently introduced OH-58D helicopters. Delivery expected in 2020.
Purchase of modern fighter that will replace aging MiG-21 has finally been agreed between Croatia and France, 12 Rafale F3-R formerly of French Air Force have been purchased for €1 billion, purchase includes spare parts, training and long term support and training. Croatia was looking to purchase brand new fighter since 2010, but due to various issues purchase of a modern replacement for the MiG-21 never materialized. Croatian requirements are for two squadrons, one based in Zagreb and one based in Zadar, however beyond current 12 fighter deal it is not clear if Croatia will seek another batch of Rafale aircraft sometime later.
Croatia has begun the process of acquiring 12 multi-role Dassault Rafale fighters (10 single-seat and 2 two-seat aircraft). Prime Minister Andrej Plenković stated that the purchase will significantly increase the capabilities of the Air Force. The deal is to be worth some €999 million (U.S. $1.2 billion) and, in addition to the aircraft, it will cover weapon systems, spare parts, logistics and training.

Aircraft

Current inventory

Retired 
Previous notable aircraft operated by the Air Force were the UTVA-75, Antonov An-2, Antonov An-32, Canadair CL-215, MD 500, and Mi-24D/V

See also
 History of Croatian Air Force
 Austro-Hungarian Imperial and Royal Aviation Troops
 Yugoslav Royal Air Force
 Air Force of the Independent State of Croatia
 Croatian Air Force Legion
 Yugoslav Partisans
 Balkan Air Force
 Yugoslav Air Force

References

Bibliography
 Lisko, T. and Canak, D., Hrvatsko Ratno Zrakoplovstvo u Drugome Svjetskom Ratu (The Croatian Airforce in the Second World War) Zagreb, 1998 .
 Savic, D. and Ciglic, B. Croatian Aces of World War II Osprey Aircraft of the Aces – 49, Oxford, 2002 .

External links

 (English version)
War is Boring

 
Air forces by country
Aviation in Croatia
Military units and formations established in 1991
1991 establishments in Croatia